Saint Peter Evangelical Church of Tehran,, is a Protestant church in Tehran, Iran.

Location
It is located in Si-e-Tir (Qavam-ol-Saltaneh) Street (fa).

History
It is established in 1876 by American missionaries on land granted by Naser al-Din Shah. Currently it is being used by Armenian and Assyrian protestants and Korean expatriates in Iran.

See also
Christianity in Iran
List of religious centers in Tehran
Community School, Tehran
Iran Bethel School
James Bassett

References

Tourist attractions in Tehran
Architecture in Iran
Churches in Tehran
Protestantism in Iran
Iran–United States relations